Devon General first operated open top buses in Torbay in 1919 but reintroduced open top buses on tourist routes in 1955. New buses were introduced in 1961 which were known as 'Sea Dogs' because of the names they were given, but these were later replaced by those of 'Warships'.

History

A service of open top trams was introduced by the Torquay Tramways in 1907 on a network around Torquay that included Beacon Quay, St Marychurch and Babbacombe. The following year saw an additional route along Torbay Road which terminated near Torquay railway station, then in 1911 it was extended to Paignton. The Devon General Omnibus and Touring Company started operations in south Devon in 1919 with two bus routes from Exeter to Torquay. These were operated with the usual open top buses of the era. In 1922 Torquay Tramways bought Devon General, although it was operated as a subsidiary and the motor buses already owned by the tramway company were transferred to the omnibus company. The tram network was closed in January 1934.

In the 1930s a few seaside resorts started to see open top buses operated as tourist attractions on their seaside roads. More resorts started such services in the years following World War II. In 1955 five old buses had their roofs removed for services in Torbay and one more was converted for Exmouth, another resort served by Devon General. They entered service on 19 June and a new sea front route was started on 19 July. These proved a success and so a larger fleet of new buses were delivered for service in 1961. They were launched at a naming ceremony on 11 May 1961. These were 'convertible' buses that could operated as open tops during the summer and with roofs during the remainder of the year, although after the first winter they were usually stored during the winter as putting the roofs on caused some damage. It took half an hour to fit or remove a roof using the mechanism that had worked a bus washing machine which had recently been superseded. When not in use the roofs were stored on three mobile racks made from old bus chassis from which the bodies had been removed.

Devon General was privatised in 1986 and became a part of Transit Holdings. This company preferred to operate minibuses and the open top fleet was reduced to just one vehicle. This was transferred to a new Bayline operation, which covered services in Torbay and Newton Abbot, in 1992.

Bayline was sold to the Stagecoach Group in 1996, and became part of the new Stagecoach in Devon operation in 2003. Stagecoach brought a revival of large buses instead of minibuses, and a larger fleet of open top buses was established.

Routes

The first route to be introduced in 1955 was the 12A from St Marychurch through Babbacombe, Torquay, Paignton and Goodrington to Broadsands. To reach Paignton's sea front at Preston the bus had to pass under a very low railway bridge. A licence for the route was only granted on condition that buses would come to a stop before passing under the bridge, the conductor would then have to instruct passengers on the top deck to remain in their seats and then stand at the top of the stairs to see that they did.

From 1959 a second route was operated. The 12C followed the same route as the 12A from St Marychurch to Goodrington but then continued to Churston and Kingswear instead of turning down to the sea front at Broadsands. 

The larger fleet of "Sea Dogs" available for the 1961 season allowed two further routes to be added. One was the 12B, which was already operating with conventional buses between Brixham and Kingswear. The second was a new 12D which followed the usual route from Babbacombe to Goodrington then continued through Churston to Brixham. Devon General routes were renumbered in 1975 which saw the sea front services numbered from 120, and additional buses allowed a Torquay to Dawlish Warren service to be offered the following year.

Today just two seasonal services are operated by different operators, with a third offering a scenic tour from Torquay.

Seasonal open top services on route 122 operate from Hoburne Devon Bay holiday park to Babbacombe but closed top buses operate all year round from South Devon College through Paignton and St Marychurch to Dawlish Warren along a similar route to the 122.

Vehicles

First buses
Devon General's first buses were AEC YC type with roofless double-deck bodies typical at the time. A second-hand AEC B-type was bought from the London General Omnibus Company in 1920 but was rebuilt after a few months. The Torquay Tramways purchased six AEC K-type double deck buses in 1921 which were transferred to the Devon General fleet the following year. Double deck buses delivered from 1929 were fitted with roofs and by 1932 the open top buses had been sold or rebuilt as single deck vehicles.

Devon General

The six old buses rebuilt to open top form in 1955 were 21-year-old AEC Regent Is with bodies by Short Brothers. These were replaced by nine Leyland Atlanteans with convertible Weymann bodies in 1961. These were all given the names of historic sailors and known as "Sea Dogs". In 1976 two AEC Regent Vs with Willowbrook bodies had their roofs removed and were added to the open top fleet.

The Sea Dogs were replaced in 1978 by nine new Bristol VRTs with 74 seat Eastern Coach Works convertible bodies. Two of the VRTs were allocated to Southern National when Western National's Somerset and Dorset operations were divested in 1983 but five continued to operate at Torbay until the end of the 1990 season. After this a limited open top service was operated with just one bus.

Western National

From 1971 Devon General became part of Western National but services around Torbay continued to operate in the old name and buses were sometimes moved between the fleets for short term loans or on a more permanent basis. Two rare Bristol LDLs in the Western National fleet had their tops removed from 1972/3 for operation at Penzance and one of these was swapped in 1975 for Sir Francis Drake, and the other in 1977 for Admiral Blake. When the nine "Warship" VRTs were ordered for Devon General, two more were ordered for Western National. Both Atlanteans and VRTs also operated seasonal services at Weymouth. Western National's usual livery for open top buses was white and green, although Sir Francis Drake retained its red and white scheme.

Stagecoach

By 1996, when Devon General was sold to the Stagecoach Group, the open top fleet at Torbay had been reduced to just one vehicle, but the new owners quickly boosted this by drafting in additional Bristol VRs from other parts of the group. The first two (936 and 937) came from Sussex Coastline in 1996 and three more (932 to 934) arrived in 1998 from Bluebird in Scotland but came without their roofs. A heritage vehicle, in the shape of Leyland Titan PD1 LRV 992 was also sent from Portsmouth to Torbay and was often used on scheduled services alongside the Bristol VRs.

Most of the Bristol VRs were withdrawn after the 1999 season, although 936 and 937 were sold to Dart Pleasure Craft to operate services in connection with their boats on the River Dart. Eight Scania N113s were then transferred from London. Their roofs were removed on arrival but five (numbers 15322 – 15326) were done in such a way as to be convertible back to roofed buses. and they generally operate in this form, open top services being in the main provided by 15327–15329. They are all named and, like the Leyland Atlanteans of 1961, are named after British sailors. The Scania's were withdrawn from use on 3 November 2013 (The closing day of Devon Cliffs holiday park), 15329 being the last in service. They were replaced by an Alexander ALX400-bodied Dennis Trident 2.

Independent operators
Wallace Arnold kept an open top Leyland PD3 at Torquay for many years. It was used on local tours and shuttle services in connection with its longer distance operations. It even travelled to Lisbon on one occasion. Dart Pleasure Craft, trading as 'Rail River Link' started services in 2000 using Bristol VRTs (two of which were obtained from Stagecoach Devon). More recently Devonian Motor Services and English Riviera Tours have introduced a wider variety of bus types on new routes. One of Devon General's former "Sea Dogs" is in the Devonian fleet.

See also

 Open top buses in the United Kingdom
 Open top buses in Weston-super-Mare

Sources

References

Torbay
Bus routes in England
Transport in Devon
Open-top buses